Swiecino may refer to:
Świecino, Puck County, Poland
Święcino, Słupsk County, Poland